The Stelzer engine is a two-stroke opposing-piston free-piston engine design proposed by Frank Stelzer. It uses conjoined pistons in a push-pull arrangement which allows for fewer moving parts and simplified manufacturing. An engine of the same design appeared on the cover of the February 1969 issue of Mechanix Illustrated magazine.

Operation
There are two combustion chambers and a central precompression chamber. Control of the air flow between the precompression chamber and the combustion chambers is made by stepped piston rods.

Applications
Applications envisaged for the engine include driving:
 An air compressor
 A hydraulic pump
 A linear generator

Prototypes
A prototype engine was demonstrated in Frankfurt in 1983 and Opel was reported to be interested in it. In 1982, the Government of Ireland agreed to pay half the cost of a factory at Shannon Airport to manufacture the engines.  A prototype car with a Stelzer engine and electric transmission was shown at a German motor show in 1983.

See also
 Linear alternator

References

External links
  -- Two-Stroke Internal Combustion Engine 1983
 Diagrams of Stelzer engine and linear alternator

Proposed engines
Free-piston engines